Lewie is an English surname and male given name. Notable people with this name include:

 Jona Lewie (born 1947), English singer-songwriter
 Lewie Coyle (born 1995), English football player
 Lewie G. Merritt (1897–1974), American major general
 Lewie Gold, member of Captain Beyond
 Lewie Diaz, a fictional character in the Disney series, Stuck in the Middle
 Lewie Hardage
 Lewie Steinberg (1933–2016), American musician